Bibern can mean either of two municipalities of Switzerland:

Bibern, Solothurn
Bibern, Schaffhausen